Gamle sanger om igjen is a compilation from the Norwegian rock band deLillos.

Track listing
"Suser avgårde alle mann"
"Tøff i pysjamas"
"Min beibi dro avsted"
"S'il vous plait"
"Balladen om Kåre og Nelly"
"Vår"
"Sveve over byen"
"Hjernen er alene"
"Den feite mannen"
"Da tiern var gul"
"Nitten åttifire"
"Glemte minner"
"Neste sommer"
"Kokken Tor"
"Smak av honning"
"Nå lever den av seg selv"
"Fullstendig oppslukt av frykt"
"Mor"
"Mantra (hidden track"

1997 compilation albums
DeLillos albums
Sonet Records albums